Albert Finney (9 May 1936 – 7 February 2019) was an English actor. He attended the Royal Academy of Dramatic Art and worked in the theatre before attaining prominence on screen in the early 1960s, debuting with The Entertainer (1960), directed by Tony Richardson, who had previously directed him in the theatre. He maintained a successful career in theatre, film and television.

He is known for his roles in Saturday Night and Sunday Morning (1960), Tom Jones (1963), Two for the Road (1967), Scrooge (1970), Annie (1982), The Dresser (1983), Miller's Crossing (1990), A Man of No Importance (1994), Erin Brockovich (2000), Big Fish (2003), The Bourne Ultimatum (2007), Before the Devil Knows You're Dead (2007), and the James Bond film Skyfall (2012).

A recipient of BAFTA, Golden Globe, Emmy, Screen Actors Guild, Silver Bear and Volpi Cup awards, Finney was nominated for an Academy Award five times, as Best Actor four times, for Tom Jones (1963), Murder on the Orient Express (1974), The Dresser (1983), and Under the Volcano (1984), and as Best Supporting Actor for Erin Brockovich (2000). He received several awards for his performance as Winston Churchill in the 2002 BBC–HBO television biographical film The Gathering Storm.

Early life
Finney was born in Salford, Lancashire, the son of Alice (née Hobson) and Albert Finney, a bookmaker. He was educated at Tootal Drive Primary School, Salford Grammar School and the Royal Academy of Dramatic Art (RADA), from which he graduated in 1956.

Career

Early career
While at RADA Finney made an early TV appearance playing Mr Hardcastle in Oliver Goldsmith's She Stoops to Conquer. The BBC filmed and broadcast the RADA students' performances at the Vanbrugh Theatre in London on Friday 6 January 1956. Other members of the cast included Roy Kinnear and Richard Briers. Finney graduated from RADA and became a member of the Royal Shakespeare Company.

Finney was offered a contract by the Rank Organisation but turned it down to perform for the Birmingham Rep. He was in a production of The Miser for Birmingham Rep, which was filmed for the BBC in 1956. Also for the BBC he appeared in The Claverdon Road Job (1957) and View Friendship and Marriage (1958). At Birmingham he played the title role in Henry V, and in 1958, made his London stage debut in Jane Arden's The Party, directed by Charles Laughton, who starred in the production along with his wife, Elsa Lanchester. In 1959 Finney appeared at Stratford in the title role in Coriolanus, replacing an ill Laurence Olivier. Finney guest starred on several episodes of Emergency-Ward 10 and was Lysander in a TV version of A Midsummer Night's Dream (1959) directed by Peter Hall.

Finney's first film appearance was in Tony Richardson's The Entertainer (1960), with Laurence Olivier. Finney and Alan Bates played Olivier's sons. He made his film breakthrough in the same year with his portrayal of a disillusioned factory worker in Karel Reisz's film version of Alan Sillitoe's Saturday Night and Sunday Morning (1960), produced by Richardson. The film was a box-office success, being the third most popular film in Britain that year. It earned over half a million pounds in profit. Finney then did Billy Liar (1960) on stage and for British television. Finney had been chosen to play T. E. Lawrence in David Lean's production of Lawrence of Arabia after a successful and elaborate screen-test that took four days to shoot. However, Finney baulked at signing a multi-year contract for producer Sam Spiegel and chose not to accept the role.

Finney created the title role in Luther, the 1961 play by John Osborne depicting the life of Martin Luther. He performed the role with the English Stage Company in London, Nottingham, Paris and New York. The original West End run at the Phoenix ended in March 1962, after 239 performances there, when Finney had to leave the cast to fulfil a contractual obligation with a film company.

Tom Jones
Finney starred in the Academy Award-winning 1963 film Tom Jones, directed by Richardson and written by Osborne. The success of Tom Jones saw British exhibitors vote Finney the ninth most popular star at the box office in 1963. Finney received 10% of the films earnings, which made him over $1 million.

Finney followed this with a small part in ensemble war movie The Victors (1963), which was not a success. He then made his Broadway debut in Luther in 1963. When that run ended he decided to take a year off and sail around the world. "People told me to cash in on my success while I was hot," he later said. "I'd been acting for about eight years and had only had one vacation ... Captain Cook had been a hero of mine when I was a kid, and I thought it would be exciting to go to some of the places in the Pacific where he'd been."

The success of Tom Jones enabled Finney to produce his next film, Night Must Fall, in 1964, which he also starred in and which was directed by Reisz.  A remake of the classic 1937 film of the same title, the film was a flop and Finney's performance received poor reviews.

1963–1974

Finney undertook a season of plays at the Royal National Theatre, including Miss Julie by August Strindberg in 1965. He returned to films with Two for the Road (1967) co starring Audrey Hepburn.

He and Michael Medwin formed a production company, Memorial Productions, which made Privilege (1967), directed by Peter Watkins; The Burning (1968), a short directed by Stephen Frears; and If.... (1968), directed by Lindsay Anderson. Memorial also did stage productions, such as A Day in the Death of Joe Egg, which Finney performed in London and then Broadway. Memorial also produced some in which Finney did not appear, such as Spring and Port Wine and The Burgular.

Memorial then made Charlie Bubbles (1968), which Finney starred in and also directed. Liza Minnelli made her feature debut in the film. Finney later called it "the most intense sense of creation I've ever had."

Finney starred in The Picasso Summer in 1969, and played the title role in the musical Scrooge in 1970.

Finney then made Gumshoe (1971), the first feature film directed by Stephen Frears, for Memorial. Memorial continued to produce films in which Finney did not appear: Spring and Port Wine (1970), with James Mason; Loving Memory (1971), an early directorial effort from Tony Scott; Bleak Moments (1971), the first feature from Mike Leigh; O Lucky Man! (1973) for Anderson; and Law and Disorder (1974); shot in Hollywood.

In 1972 Finney returned to the stage after a six-year absence with Alpha Beta, which he later filmed for TV with Rachel Roberts.

Memorial Productions pulled out of producing and Finney focused on acting. "It was OK at first," he later said, "but in the end it was sitting in an office, pitching ideas to Hollywood and waiting for the phone to ring."

Murder on the Orient Express
Finney played Agatha Christie's Belgian master detective Hercule Poirot in the film Murder on the Orient Express (1974). Finney became so well known for the role that he complained that it typecast him for a number of years, "People really do think I am 300 pounds with a French accent", he said. He received nominations for the Academy Award for Best Actor and the BAFTA Award for Best Actor in a Leading Role.

He announced he intended to direct a film, The Girl in Melanie Klein, for Memorial, but it was not made.

Finney decided to take time off from features and focus on stage acting, doing classics at the National Theatre in London. "I felt that it needed commitment," he later said. "When you're making movies all the time, you stop breathing. You literally don't breathe in the same way that you do when you're playing the classics. When you have to deliver those long, complex speeches on stage, you can't heave your shoulders after every sentence. The set of muscles required for that kind of acting need to be trained. I really wanted to try and do justice to my own potential in the parts. I didn't want to be a movie actor just dropping in, doing Hamlet and taking off again. I wanted to feel part of the company."

Finney was at the National for over three years during which he played in Hamlet, Macbeth, Tamburlaine, and plays by Anton Chekhov.

Finney made a TV film Forget-Me-Not-Lane in 1975, which was written by Peter Nichols, and he also performed a cameo role in The Duellists (1977), the first feature directed by Ridley Scott. He also released an album through Motown.

1980s
Finney had not played a lead role in a feature film in six years, and started to think about returning to cinema. The last two successful films he had made were Scrooge and Orient Express in which he was heavily disguised. "Most Americans probably think I weigh 300 pounds, have black hair and talk with a French accent like Hercule Poirot," said Finney. "So I thought they should have a look at me while I was still almost a juvenile and kind of cute."

Finney decided to make six films in succession "so that I could relax and get back into it again. In order to feel really assured and comfortable in front of a camera, you've got to do it for a while."

The first three were thrillers: Loophole (1981), with Susannah York; Wolfen (1981), directed by Michael Wadleigh; and Looker (1981), written and directed by Michael Crichton.

He received excellent reviews for his performance in the drama Shoot the Moon (1982). Finney said the role "required personal acting; I had to dig into myself. When you have to expose yourself and use your own vulnerability, you can get a little near the edge."

Less well received was his performance as Daddy Warbucks in the Hollywood film version of Annie (1982), which was directed by John Huston. Finney said going into this film  after Shoot the Moon was "marvelous. I use a completely different side of myself as Warbucks. Annie is show biz; it's open, simple and direct. It needs bold, primary colors. I don't have to reveal the inner workings of the character, and that's a relief."

Finney starred in Peter Yates-directed film The Dresser (1983) as Sir, a deteriorating veteran actor struggling through a difficult performance of King Lear. He earned nominations for the Academy Award for Best Actor, the BAFTA Award for Best Actor in a Leading Role, and the Golden Globe Award for Best Actor – Motion Picture Drama. He then played the title role in the TV movie Pope John Paul II (1984), his American television debut.

Huston cast Finney in the lead role of Under the Volcano (1984), which earned both men great acclaim, including another Best Actor Oscar nomination for Finney.

Finney played the lead role of Sydney Kentridge in The Biko Inquest, a 1984 dramatisation of the inquest into the death of Steve Biko which was filmed for television following a London run.

Finney performed on stage in Orphans in 1986, then did the film version, directed by Alan J. Pakula. He had the lead in a television miniseries, The Endless Game (1989), written and directed by Bryan Forbes.

1990s
Finney began the 1990s with the lead role in a film for HBO, The Image (1990). He received great acclaim playing the gangster boss in Miller's Crossing (1990), replacing Trey Wilson shortly before filming.

Finney made an appearance at Roger Waters' The Wall – Live in Berlin (1990), where he played "The Judge" during the performance of "The Trial".

Finney starred in the BBC TV serial The Green Man, based on the Kingsley Amis novel.

He followed it with The Playboys (1992) for Gillies MacKinnon; Rich in Love (1993) for Bruce Beresford; The Browning Version (1994) for Mike Figgis; A Man of No Importance (1994), for Suri Krishnamma; and The Run of the Country (1995) for Peter Yates. In 1994, Finney played a gay bus conductor in early 1960s Dublin in A Man of No Importance.

He had the lead role in Dennis Potter's final two plays, Karaoke (1996) and Cold Lazarus (both 1996). In the latter he played a frozen, disembodied head.

Finney did Nostromo (1997) for television, and Washington Square (1997) for Agnieszka Holland then made A Rather English Marriage (1998) with Tom Courtenay. He had supporting roles in Breakfast of Champions (1999) and Simpatico (1999).

2000s
Finney had his biggest hit in several years with Erin Brockovich (2000), alongside Julia Roberts for Steven Soderbergh. His portrayal of real-life California lawyer Edward L. Masry earned him a nomination for the Academy Award for Best Supporting Actor, his fifth and final Oscar nomination.

Finney had a cameo in Soderbergh's Traffic (2000) and played Ernest Hemingway in Hemingway, the Hunter of Death (2001) for TV.

He had the lead in Delivering Milo (2001) and in 2002 his critically acclaimed portrayal of Winston Churchill in The Gathering Storm won him British Academy of Film and Television Arts (BAFTA), Emmy and Golden Globe awards as Best Actor.

He also played the title role in the television series My Uncle Silas, based on the short stories by H. E. Bates, about a roguish but lovable poacher-cum-farm labourer looking after his great-nephew. The show ran for two series broadcast in 2001 and 2003.

Finney had a key role in Big Fish (2003) directed by Tim Burton, and did another cameo for Soderbergh in Ocean's Twelve (2004). He sang in Tim Burton's Corpse Bride (2005) and the film of Aspects of Love (2005).

Finney was reunited with Ridley Scott in A Good Year (2006). He had support roles in Amazing Grace (2006), The Bourne Ultimatum (2007), and Before the Devil Knows You're Dead (2007). His final film role was in Skyfall (2012).

A lifelong supporter of Manchester United, Finney narrated the documentary Munich, about the air crash that killed most of the Busby Babes in 1958, which was shown on United's TV channel MUTV in February 2008.

Theatre
He received Tony Award nominations for Luther (1964) and A Day in the Death of Joe Egg (1968),    and also starred on stage in Love for Love, Strindberg's Miss Julie, Black Comedy, The Country Wife, Alpha Beta, Beckett's Krapp's Last Tape, Tamburlaine the Great, Another Time and, his last stage appearance, in 1997, "Art" by Yasmina Reza, which preceded the 1998 Tony Award-winning Broadway run.

He won an Olivier Award for Orphans in 1986 and won three Evening Standard Theatre Awards for Best Actor.

Finney never abandoned stage work and continued his association with the National Theatre Company in London, where he had performed in the mid-1960s in Shakespeare's Much Ado About Nothing  at the Old Vic and Chekhov's The Cherry Orchard in the 1970s at the National Theatre.

Personal life and death
With his first wife, Jane Wenham, he had a son,  Simon Finney, who works in the film industry as a camera operator. In 1970, nearly a decade after his divorce from Wenham, Finney married French actress Anouk Aimée, a union that lasted eight years. He then married for the third and last time in 2006, to Penelope Delmage, who at the time was working as a travel agent. They remained together until Finney's death.

Finney in May 2011 publicly disclosed that he had been receiving treatment for kidney cancer. According to a 2012 interview, he had been diagnosed with the disease five years earlier and had undergone surgery, followed by six rounds of chemotherapy. Finney died of a chest infection at the Royal Marsden Hospital on 7 February 2019; he was 82.

Acting credits

Film

Television

Stage

Awards and nominations
Finney declined the offer of a CBE in 1980, as well as a knighthood in 2000. He criticised such honours as "perpetuating snobbery".

Other awards
Other awards include: a Golden Laurel for his work on Scrooge (1970) and for his work on Tom Jones, for which he was the 3rd Place Winner for the "Top Male Comedy Performance" for 1964. He was honoured by the Los Angeles Film Critics Association as Best Actor for Under the Volcano (which he tied with F. Murray Abraham for Amadeus), the National Board of Review Best Actor award for Saturday Night and Sunday Morning, and the New York Film Critics Circle Best Actor award for Tom Jones.

Finney won two Screen Actors Guild Awards, for Best Performance by a Male Actor in a Supporting Role, for Erin Brockovich, and as a member of the acting ensemble in the film Traffic. He was also nominated for The Gathering Storm, for Best Performance by a Male Actor in a Television Movie or Miniseries, but did not win.

He won the Silver Berlin Bear award for Best Actor, for The Dresser, at the 34th Berlin International Film Festival in 1984.

He won the Volpi Cup for Best Actor, for Tom Jones, at the Venice Film Festival.

References

Further reading

Hershman, Gabriel. Strolling Player – The Life and Career of Albert Finney The History Press, 2017,

External links

 

 
 Albert Finney filmography at the British Film Institute

1936 births
2019 deaths
20th-century English male actors
21st-century English male actors
Alumni of RADA
BAFTA fellows
BAFTA Most Promising Newcomer to Leading Film Roles winners
Best Actor BAFTA Award (television) winners
Best Miniseries or Television Movie Actor Golden Globe winners
Best Musical or Comedy Actor Golden Globe (film) winners
English male film actors
English male Shakespearean actors
English male stage actors
English male television actors
English male voice actors
Laurence Olivier Award winners
Male actors from Salford
New Star of the Year (Actor) Golden Globe winners
Outstanding Performance by a Cast in a Motion Picture Screen Actors Guild Award winners
Outstanding Performance by a Lead Actor in a Miniseries or Movie Primetime Emmy Award winners
Outstanding Performance by a Male Actor in a Supporting Role Screen Actors Guild Award winners
People educated at Salford Grammar School
Silver Bear for Best Actor winners
Volpi Cup for Best Actor winners